Sevinç Çorlu (born December 3, 1990) is a Turkish women's football defender currently playing in the Turkish Women's First Football League for Fenerbahçe in İstanbul with jersey number 24. She is member of the Turkey women's national team since 2008.

Career

Club

Sevinç Çorlu began her football career after she obtained her license on May 11, 2007. During her high school years, she played in the school team Ümraniye Mevlana Lisesispor for one season. She then became part of the club Ataşehirspor in the 2009–10 season, where she plays since then uninterrupted. Currently, she is captain of the team.

Çorlu enjoyed to successive league championships in the 2010–11 and 2011–12 seasons. She participated at the 2011–12 UEFA Women's Champions League and 2012–13 UEFA Women's Champions League matches.

In August 2018, she transferred to the Izmir-based rival Konak Belediyespor. She took part in three matches of the 2017–18 UEFA Women's Champions League qualifying round.

International

Çorlu was admitted to the Turkey women's U-19 national team, and debuted in the 2009 UEFA Women's U-19 Championship qualification match against Austria on September 25, 2008. She capped 3 times in the U-19 national team.

She played first time for the national team in the friendly match against Kazakhstan on March 14, 2008. She was called up for the UEFA Women's Euro 2013 qualifying – Group 2 matches, had however to sit on the bench. Çorlu played at the 2015 FIFA Women's World Cup qualification – UEFA Group 6 match against Belarus.

Career statistics
.

Honours 
 Turkish Women's First Football League
 Ataşehir Belediyespor
 Winners (2): 2010–11, 2011–12
 Runners-up (4): 2012–13, 2013–14, 2014–15, 2015–16

Turkish Women's Second League
 Ümraniye Mevlana Lisesispor
 Winners (1): 2008–09

References

External links
 

Living people
1990 births
People from Kadıköy
Footballers from Istanbul
Turkish women's footballers
Turkey women's international footballers
Women's association football defenders
Ataşehir Belediyespor players
Konak Belediyespor players
Fenerbahçe S.K. women's football players